Alexandros may refer to:

Alexandros, a Greek name, the origin for the English name Alexander
Alexander III of Macedon, commonly known as Alexander the Great
Alexandros, Greece, a village on the island of Lefkada
Alexandros (band), a Japanese rock band

See also

Alexander (disambiguation)
Alexandro

Greek masculine given names